Nikolayevka, Armenia may refer to:
 Amrakits, formerly Nikolayevka
 Jraber, formerly Nikolayevka